Clivina machadoi is a species of ground beetle in the subfamily Scaritinae. It was described by Basilewsky in 1955.

References

machadoi
Beetles described in 1955